In Munich, there are 59 professional theaters (as of 1999) and a variety of amateur theaters.

Major theaters include:

State theatres 
 Bayerische Staatsoper (main venue: Nationaltheater München)
 Bayerisches Staatsballett (venue: Nationaltheater München)
 Bayerisches Staatsschauspiel (main venue: Residence Theatre)
 Cuvilliés-Theater
 Pavillon 21 MINI Opera Space
 Prinzregententheater (played by the Bayerische Theaterakademie August Everding, the state theater and concerts)
 Staatstheater am Gärtnerplatz

City theatres 
 Münchner Kammerspiele
 Münchner Volkstheater
 Schauburg (München) – Theater der Jugend
 Deutsches Theater, the largest theater for guest performances in Germany

Private theatres 
 Akademietheater
 Blutenburg-Theater, Germany's first and unique crime scene
 Das kleine Welttheater
 FestSpielHaus of youth culture in Munich-Neuperlach
 Gerhard Loew Bühne in Oberanger Theater
 GOP Varieté-Theater (formerly Kleine Komödie am Max-II-Denkmal)
 Heppel & Ettlich
 Hinterhoftheater
 Iberl-Bühne in München-Solln 
 I-camp/Neues Theater München in München-Au
 INTERIM-Theater
 Kammertheater München, earlier Kammertheater Schwabing
 Komödie im Bayerischen Hof
 LEO 17 - Theater in der Leopoldstraße
 Puppetry Kleines Spiel
 Metropol-Theater
 Münchner Galerie Theater
 Münchner Marionettentheater
 Münchner Theater für Kinder
 Münchner Vorstadtbrettl
 Pathos Transport Theater
 Rationaltheater
 Rohrer & Brammer; closed since May 2010 
 Teamtheater, formerly Theater am Einlaß
 Theater44; closed since May 2009
 Theater aus der Reisetasche
 Theater Blaue Maus
 Theater Die Kleine Freiheit (closed)
 theater Viel Lärm um Nichts in the Pasinger Fabrik
 theater ... und so fort, Munich
 TamS

Amateur theatres 
 ArtikultTheater
 Dramatischer Club "Alpenröserl" e.V.
 Theatergruppe "Die ganz Andern"
 Theater in der Au e.V.
 Theatergruppe Musikforum Blutenburg e.V. 	 	
 Ludwigsbühne München	
 s'Bredl
 el teatro e.V.
 Erlebnis Oper e.V.
 Feldmochinger Volkstheater e.V. 		
 TSV Forstenried e.V.
 Theater gruppo di grappa 	
 Münchner Heimatbühne e.V. 	 	
 Theaterteam Helena
 Kachina Theater GbR
 Theater im Kloster
 Kleine Bühne München e.V.
 Komödien-Brettl Untermenzing	
 Laimer Brett'l e.V.
 "Lampenfieber" Bayerisches Volkstheater	 	
 Menzinger Komödienstadl		
 Milbertshofener Bühne e.V. 	 
 Laienspielgruppe "s’Moosacher Brett’l" e.V.
 Heimatbühne Obergiesing e.V.	
 Bauerntheater in Obermenzing		
 Theatergruppe der Pfarrei St. Quirin	 	
 Theatergruppe "Rasselglocke"	
 Sendlinger Bauernbühne	
 Theatergruppe Siemens e.V.
 Spielgemeinschaft Kleine Bühne e.V. 	
 "Die Spielmacher"
 Südtiroler Volksbühne e.V. 	 
 "Szenenwechsel"
 Theaterbrett´l 1993 (ehem. Theaterbrett'l St. Klara)	
 Theatritis
 Thow & Show
 Theaterverein „Die lustigen Truderinger“ 	 	
 Theater-Truhe
 Bayerisches Volkskunsttheater	
 Münchner Heimtbühne e.V. 
 Münchner Volkssänger-Bühne e.V.	 	
 Münchner Vorstadtbrettl
 Volksbühne Waldheim e.V.
 Laienspielgruppe Waldtrudering	
 Bayerische Volksbühne Watzmann e.V.	
 Weiß-Blaue Bühne e.V.

See also 
List of theatres in Bavaria

 
Munich
Theatre
Munich